Basarh is a village in the Vaishali district of Bihar, India. It is the location of the ancient Vaishali city.

According to the 2011 census of India, Basarh has 14,084 people in 2,667 households. The population includes 7,289 males and 6,795 females. The effective literacy rate (that is, literacy rate of the population aged 6 years and above) of the village is 56.84%. The area of the village is 10.01 km2.

References 

Villages in Vaishali district
Archaeological sites in Bihar